The 2014 Military Bowl was a college football bowl game played on December 27, 2014 at Navy–Marine Corps Memorial Stadium on the campus of the United States Naval Academy in Annapolis, Maryland in the United States.  The seventh annual Military Bowl, it pitted the American Athletic Conference co-champion Cincinnati Bearcats against the Virginia Tech Hokies of the Atlantic Coast Conference. It was one of the 2014–15 bowl games will conclude the 2014 FBS football season. The game started at 1:00 p.m. EST and aired on ESPN.  It was sponsored by aerospace and defense technology company Northrop Grumman and is officially known as the Military Bowl Presented by Northrop Grumman.

Teams
The game featured the Virginia Tech Hokies of the Atlantic Coast Conference against the American Athletic Conference co-champion Cincinnati Bearcats.  Whit Babcock, the Hokies' director of athletics, previously held the same position at Cincinnati and hired Bearcats' coach Tommy Tuberville.

This was 11th overall meeting between these two teams, with series tied 5–5 before the game. The previous time these two teams met was in 2012. This was also the third bowl game between these two teams, the others being the 1947 Sun Bowl and the 2009 Orange Bowl.

Cincinnati Bearcats

After finishing their regular season with a 9–3 record and winning the American Athletic Conference co-championship, the Bearcats accepted their invitation to play in the game.

Virginia Tech Hokies

After finishing their regular season with a 6–6 record, the Hokies accepted their invitation to play in the game.

Game summary

Scoring summary

Source:

Statistics

References

Military Bowl
Military Bowl
Cincinnati Bearcats football bowl games
Virginia Tech Hokies football bowl games
December 2014 sports events in the United States
Military Bowl